Beintza-Labaien is a municipality located in the province and autonomous community of Navarra, in northern Spain.

References

External links

Municipalities in Navarre